Rodion Rosko Davelaar (born 6 August 1990, Willemstad) is an Antillean swimmer. He competed at the 2008 Summer Olympics in the 50 metre freestyle.

References

External links
Rodion Davelaar
Olympic profile at sportsreference.com

1990 births
Living people
Swimmers at the 2008 Summer Olympics
Olympic swimmers of the Netherlands Antilles
Dutch Antillean male swimmers
People from Willemstad
Florida Gators men's swimmers
Swimmers at the 2007 Pan American Games
Swimmers at the 2011 Pan American Games
Pan American Games competitors for the Netherlands Antilles